The Temiar are a Senoic group indigenous to the Malay peninsula and one of the largest of the eighteen Orang Asli groups of Malaysia. They reside mainly within Perak, Pahang and Kelantan states. The total ethnic population is estimated at around 40,000 to 120,000, most of which live on the fringes of the rainforest, while a small number have been urbanised.

Temiar are traditionally animists, giving great significance to nature, dreams and spiritual healing. The ceremonial Sewang dance is also performed by the Temiar people as part of their folk beliefs.

Population
The changes in the population of the Temiar people are as the following:-

Culture

Traditional food
 Nasi serempad, rice cooked in bamboo
 Umbut Bayas Masak Gulai, pith curry
 Pucuk Paku Peno’ol, vegetable pucuk paku fern, tapioca leaves and anchovies cooked in bamboo

Settlement area
Major settlements of the Temiar are namely:-
 Jeram Bertam, Kelantan
 Kampung Chengkelik, Kuala Betis, Kelantan
 Kampung Merlung, Kuala Betis, Kelantan
 Kampung Jarau Baru, Kemar, Gerik, Perak
 Kampung Sungai Cadak, Ulu Kinta, Perak
 Kampung Temakah, Perak
 Kampung Ulu Gerik, Perak
 Kampung Tonggang, Tanjung Rambutan, Perak
 Pos Poi, Lasah, Sungai Siput (North), Perak
 Pos Perwor, Lasah, Sungai Siput (North), Perak
 Air Banun, Hulu Perak District, Perak
 Kemar, Gerik, Perak

Notable people
 Zumika Azmi, Malaysian Cricketer
 Sasha Azmi, Malaysian Cricketer

See also
 Dream Theory in Malaya

References

Further reading
 Benjamin, Geoffrey. 1966. "Temiar social groupings." Federation Museums Journal 11: 1–25. 
 Benjamin, Geoffrey. 1967. "Temiar kinship." Federation Museums Journal 12: 1–25. 
 Benjamin, Geoffrey. 1968. "Temiar personal names." Bijdragen tot de Taal-, Land- en Volkenkunde 124: 99–134.  (print),  (online). .
 Benjamin, Geoffrey. 1968. "Headmanship and leadership in Temiar society." Federation Museums Journal 13: 1–43. 
 Benjamin, Geoffrey. 1993. "Temiar." In: Paul Hockings (ed.), Encyclopedia of World Cultures, Volume 5: East and Southeast Asia, Boston: G. K. Hall / New York: Macmillan, pp. 265–273. 
 Benjamin, Geoffrey. 2001. "Process and structure in Temiar social organisation." In: Razha Rashid & Wazir Jahan Karim (eds), Minority Cultures of Peninsular Malaysia: Survivals of Indigenous Heritage. Penang: Malaysian Academy of Social Sciences (AKASS), pp. 125–149. . .
 Benjamin, Geoffrey. 2014. Temiar Religion, 1964–2012: Enchantment, Disenchantment and Re-enchantment in Malaysia's Uplands. With a Foreword by James C. Scott. 68 figures. 470 pages. Singapore: NUS Press.  (paper covers)
 Jennings, Sue. 1985. "Temiar dance and the maintenance of order." In Society and the Dance, ed. Paul Spencer. Cambridge: Cambridge University Press, pp. 47–63.
 Jenning, Sue. 1995. Theatre, Ritual and Transformation: The Senoi Temiars. London: Routledge.
 Roseman, Marina. 1991. Healing Sounds from the Malaysian Rainforest: Temiar Music and Medicine. Berkeley: University of California Press.

Orang Asli
Ethnic groups in Malaysia
Indigenous peoples of Southeast Asia
Peninsular Malaysia